The Uhuru Monument (also known as Uhuru Torch Monument) is a landmark monument and tourist attraction in Dar es Salaam, Tanzania. It is a white obelisk with a replica of the Uhuru Torch mounted at its top. It is located at the Mnazi Mmoja Park in the city centre and is partly fenced.

Gallery

See also
History of Tanzania

References

External links

Monuments and memorials in Tanzania
Buildings and structures in Dar es Salaam
Tourist attractions in Dar es Salaam